The 2010–11 season was Central Coast Mariners' 6th season in the A-League since its inception in 2005.

Matches

2010–11 Pre-season friendly fixtures

2010–11 Hyundai A-League fixtures

Notes

2010–11 Finals series

Players

First team squad

Transfers

In
  Sam Gallagher from  Sydney FC
  Daniel McBreen from  Perth Glory
  Nik Mrdja from  Melbourne Victory FC
  Rostyn Griffiths from  North Queensland Fury
  Joshua Rose from  Universitatea Craiova
  Oliver Bozanic from  Reading F.C.
  Jess Vanstrattan from  Gold Coast United FC
  Michael McGlinchey from  Motherwell F.C. (loan return)
  Patricio Pérez from  Defensa y Justicia
  Patrick Zwaanswijk from  NAC Breda

Out
  Shane Huke to  Rushden & Diamonds
  Andrew Redmayne to  Brisbane Roar
  Danny Vukovic to  Konyaspor
  Dylan Macallister to  Wellington Phoenix FC
  Nigel Boogaard to  Adelaide United
  Panni Nikas to  North Queensland Fury
  Andrew Clark Retired
  Matt Crowell
  Nicky Travis
  Ahmad Elrich

Squad statistics

|}

Notes

References

External links
 Official website

2010
Central Coast Mariners